Nat Puff (born June 18, 1996), better known by her stage name Left at London (sometimes stylized as /@/), is an American singer-songwriter, producer, comedian, and internet personality from Seattle, Washington. She originally gained fame by posting short comedy sketches on Vine as well as parodies of musicians Frank Ocean, Tyler, the Creator, and Mitski. Since then she has garnered fame as an indie pop musician with several EPs including the Transgender Street Legend trilogy and the song "Revolution Lover". Her debut studio album, T.I.A.P.F.Y.H. was released on June 4, 2021 and her second studio album You Are Not Alone Enough is expected to be released.

Career

2014-2019: Career beginnings, Vine, Demo EPs,The Purple Heart, and  Transgender Street Legend Vol. 1
Puff first began writing songs in fifth grade. The Left at London project originally started as a band, though after the project fell apart Puff kept the previous group's monicker as her stage name, as she was uncomfortable using her legal name. The name Left at London comes from an experience where Puff misread the sign of a local bar called "The Loft at Tandem". She began posting short videos on Vine in 2014. In 2014 and 2015 while still in high school, Puff released three demo EPs, Youth Group Computer, 2 Rowdy 4 Dennys / Give Peace a Break, and Will Write Songs 4 Money, all receiving very limited releases. The EPs were later re-released on Bandcamp on February 5, 2021.

Puff released her first widely released extended play, The Purple Heart on June 18, 2018. That same year Transgender Street Legend, Vol. 1 was released. The later EP featured her breakout single "Revolution Lover" which went on to receive a music video and be featured in an episode of Welcome to Night Vale. In that year, she started gaining online attention thanks to the success of her viral Twitter video titled "How to Make a Frank Ocean Song". In 2019, additional parodies of Tyler, the Creator and Mitski further popularized Left at London, including recognition from both artists.

2019-present: Transgender Street Legend, Vols. 2 and 3, T.I.A.P.F.Y.H., You Are Not Alone Enough, and upcoming third studio album
In December 2019, Puff released the Dylan Brady-produced "6 Feet", the first single from Transgender Street Legend, Vol. 2. The same month she released "Santa's Homophobic", a comedic Christmas song featuring Dominique "SonicFox" McLean and SungWon Cho. "Blacknwhite (Radio Edit)" was released On January 14, 2020, as the lead single to her second studio album (at the time announced as her debut) You Are Not Alone Enough, an album themed around her mental health.

On March 17, 2020, Puff released You Wouldn't Download a Car, a mixtape of her own remixes of various popular songs. On July 20, 2020, she released the two song EP Jenny Durkan, Resign in Disgrace. The EP's title refers to Jenny Durkan, then mayor of Seattle, who [Puff] holds responsible for condoning police violence and causing "the citizens of a historically gay neighborhood to be gassed on the first day of Pride Month." The songs on the EP were also inspired by the establishment of the Capitol Hill Autonomous Zone and the murders of Charleena Lyles and Summer Taylor. The first track "Do You See Us?" appears on Transgender Street Legend, Vol. 2. On July 24, she released the four-track covers EP This One's For the Milfs, featuring covers of songs by Janelle Monae, Billie Eilish, Ginuwine, and Kanye West. A day later Tales From Transgender Street, an album of Left at London covers by other artists, was released and promoted through a virtual concert of the same name. Transgender Street Legend, Vol. 2 was released on September 25, 2020.

On September 29, 2020, Puff announced that she was working on new music part of a new duo called WOW OK. The band released their first track, a remix of "(FOREVER!!!!!!!!!)" by Glass Beach on March 5, 2021. Their debut single, "Holy Moment", was released on April 16, 2021.

On March 26, 2021, Puff announced that she would spend the next two months working on her debut album, T.I.A.P.F.Y.H.,  as part of an artist residency with the City of Shoreline Public Art Program. The release of You Are Not Alone Enough, the album previously announced as her debut, was pushed back. t.i.a.p.f.y.h. was released on June 3, 2021.

In January 2022 Puff shared on Twitter that she aims to finish You Are Not Alone Enough in April 2022 with a "mid-late fall release date" In March 2022 Puff confirmed that Transgender Street Legend, Vol. 3 had been finished and entering the mastering stage. She stated that the EP would be soul and Contemporary R&B inspired. On her Patreon she shared a song from the EP called "My Old Ways" on February 11, 2022. On May 18, 2022 she announced that Transgender Street Legend, Vol. 3 would be released on June 24, 2022, with the lead single "Make You Proud" coming on June 17, 2022.

Puff is already working on her third studio album, already having a conceptual tracklist finalized consisting of 15 tracks.

Personal life
Puff is a lesbian and a non-binary trans woman who uses she/her pronouns. Throughout her life she has struggled with ADHD, PTSD, borderline personality disorder, autism spectrum disorder, and OSDD-1b. She has frequently voiced support of plural systems. She says that her autism is what allows her to be so good at impressions, saying "I'm used to mimicking others in order to seem neurotypical and I've gotten really adept at observing things like speech patterns".

Discography

Albums
Studio albums

Mixtape

Extended plays

Singles
As lead artist

As featured artist

Other appearances
 Vera Much — "Mortifying Ordeal of Being Known" (2020)
 Phixel — "Childish" (2021)
 Knock Monsterr - "In My Walls" (2022)

Songwriting and production credits
 "Dumb Bitch Juice" — Alice Longyu Gao (2019)
 "Pushing Boulders" — Yesterday's Analog Earth Band (2019)
 "How Long?" — Gerard David Millman (2019)
 "Dumb Fast!" — Kaiya Crawford (2020)
 "Where Did I Go?" — Yung Skrrt (2020)
 "Mortifying Idea of Being Known" — Vera Much (2020)
 "Semiautomatic (demo)" — William Crooks (2020)
 "Tired" — Kaiya Crawford (2020)
 "How Do I?" — Kaiya Crawford (2020)
 "From Such a Distance" – Marbits (2021)

As part of WOW OK
Singles
"Holy Moment" (2021)

Remixes
"(FOREVER!!!!!!!!!)" — Glass Beach (2021)

References

1996 births
Living people
American indie pop musicians
Musicians from Seattle
Non-binary musicians
Transgender women musicians
LGBT people from Washington (state)
American LGBT singers
American lesbian musicians
People on the autism spectrum
Transgender non-binary people
Lesbian comedians
People with post-traumatic stress disorder
People with borderline personality disorder
People with dissociative disorder
Vine (service) celebrities
Record producers from Washington (state)
LGBT record producers
Patreon creators
Bedroom pop musicians
Transgender comedians
Non-binary comedians
20th-century LGBT people
21st-century LGBT people
Transgender singers
American LGBT comedians